Cranage is a civil parish in Cheshire East, England. It contains 12 buildings that are recorded in the National Heritage List for England as designated listed buildings.  Of these, one is listed at Grade II*, the middle grade, and the others are at Grade II.  Apart from the village of Cranage, and some residential areas, the parish is rural.  Most of the listed buildings are houses and cottages, or farmhouses and farm buildings.  The other listed buildings are a former country house, a former vicarage, a school, a bridge, and a milepost.

Key

Buildings

See also
Listed buildings in Allostock
Listed buildings in Byley
Listed buildings in Goostrey
Listed buildings in Holmes Chapel
Listed buildings in Sproston
Listed buildings in Twemlow

References
Citations

Sources

 

 

Listed buildings in the Borough of Cheshire East
Lists of listed buildings in Cheshire